Piqueria is a genus of Caribbean and Mesoamerican plants in the tribe Eupatorieae within the family Asteraceae.

 Species
 Piqueria glandulosa B.L.Turner - Michoacán
 Piqueria hintonii R.M.King - 	Guerrero
 Piqueria laxiflora B.L.Rob. & Seaton - Jalisco, Durango, Michoacán, Zacatecas
 Piqueria pilosa Kunth - Michoacán, Oaxaca, México State, Hidalgo, Guanajuato, D.F., Tamaulipas, Chiapas, Tlaxcala
 Piqueria pringlei B.L.Rob. & Seaton - México State
 Piqueria serrata A.Gray - San Luis Potosí, Jalisco, México State
 Piqueria triflora Hemsl. - Durango, Guerrero, Sinaloa, Michoacán, Nayarit, Jalisco
 Piqueria trinervia Cav. - from Tamaulipas to Panamá, also Hispaniola
 formerly included
Several dozen species once included in Piqueria but now considered better suited to other genera: Acritopappus Ageratum Alomia Clibadium Ellenbergia Erythradenia Gardnerina Guevaria Gymnocoronis Koanophyllon Ophryosporus Phalacraea Richterago Teixeiranthus Trichogonia

References

Asteraceae genera
Eupatorieae
Flora of North America
Taxa named by Antonio José Cavanilles